Tilottama Municipality is a municipality in Lumbini Province in western Nepal. Tilottama has a city population of 149,657 as per 2021 Nepal census. It is one of the tri-cities of rapidly growing Butwal-Tilottama-Bhairahawa urban agglomeration primarily based on the Siddhartha Highway in West Nepal with a total urban agglomerated population of 421,018. It was formed on May 8, 2014; when the Government of Nepal announced additional 72 municipalities, including previously proposed 37 municipalities in line with the Local Self-governance Act, 1999. On July 25, 2014; demarcation of the municipality was done along with the assignment of new wards. The original demarcation included six existing VDCs viz. Shankarnagar VDC, Aanandaban VDC, Karahiya VDC, Makrahar VDC, Tikuligadh VDC & Madhabaliya VDC. Gangoliya VDC was later merged in the municipality on 17 September 2015.

At the time of the 1991 Nepal census, it had a population of 6894 people living in 1193 individual households. As of the 2021 Nepal census, the total city population was 149,657.

Etymology 
Tilottama Municipality is named after the local river Tilottama. Whereas, the Tilottama river was named after an Apsara named Tilottama as described in Hindu mythology. "Tila" is the Sanskrit word for sesame seed or a bit and "uttama" means better or higher. Tilottama therefore means the being whose smallest particle is the finest or one who is composed of the finest and highest qualities.

Administrative divisions

Health
There are many private clinics and government health-posts. Beside these, there are auxiliary centers and private medical halls in every part of the Municipality. But the citizens of municipality are not far from the regional hospital of Butwal and Bhairawaha, which is just 10 km away from the area. The Crimson Hospital, Lumbini Eye care center and other Dental and medical centers of the Manigram are serving more than 50% patient of this Municipality.

Education 
Tilottama Campus was established in 1996 as the first private college in Rupandehi.

Rammani Multiple Campus is situated at 8 km south from Butwal Sub-Metropolitan City and 15 km north from Siddharthanagar Municipality. It is about 600m west to the Siddhartha Highway. This campus was established in 2045 B.S. Under T.U. by taking initiation by the social workers, educationists, local guardians, teachers, landlords, merchants etc. contributed to set up this campus. It is named of the Famous national Educationist & Linguist Rammani. Initially, only Management programme was launched taking affiliation from T.U. Currently, two different streams Humanities, and Management are running in master's degree level Under T.U. In the same way, three different streams namely Management, Education and Humanities are running in bachelor's degree. And Science, Management, Education & Humanities are running under Higher Secondary Board. Campus regularly publishes its annual academic calendar, annual mouthpiece "Deepika", and research journal " The Journal of Academic Development."

Lumbini Engineering College in Bhalwari is the only engineering college in the municipality. It was established in 2000. The courses offered by the college are BCA, BE Civil, BE Computer, BE Electronics and Communication, MSc Construction Management, Diploma in Civil Engineering, Diploma in Computer Engineering and Diploma in Electronics Engineering. Similarly Modern Little Flower Academy is another educational institute located in Tilottama Municipality.

Popular Places

Shankarnagar Ban Bihar and Research Center 
Shankarnagar Ban Bihar and Research Centre, simply referred as Ban Batika by locals is a popular attraction in Tilottama Municipality. The centre is maintained inside the area of Shankarnagar Community Forest. It was formally inaugurated by the Spokesperson of Constituent Assembly of Nepal on 12th Poush 2064. It is popular for its picnic spots, zoo and garden.

It was awarded Abraham Conservation Award by WWF in 2014 for its contribution in safeguarding the biodiversity of Nepal.

Economy 
Ostrich Nepal in Gangoliya is the largest ostrich farm in Asia with an area of 8.81 acres. It is a private company started in 2008. It has its higher mission  to export meat of Rs. Five billion as well as leather, fat and feather of around Rs. 2.5 billion to the international market till 2020. It has provided the locals with job opportunities. People from various part of country visit the farm daily to see the alien bird.

Jay Shiva Shakti Water Industries in Tilottama-11, Pradeepnagar is one of the processed drinking water industry of the municipality.

POOJA FARM is one of the biggest farm in whole municipality & near others municipality, located in Tilottama-11,Dhada which is just 500m east from Janavawana school. The farm include Cows,Buffalos,Goats,Chickens & Ducks. This farm gives the employment opportunities to many workers, the farm mainly focus on the supply of pure milk products & meat products. It has the area about 2Biga. The owner of field is Roshan Timilsina.

More 
The municipality was established in 2014 by the government of Nepal. There are 17 wards in this municipality. The municipality is bordered by Devdaha to the east and northeast, Butwal to the north, Padshari to the south and Motipur to the west.

Media
Radio Lumbini at 96.8 MHz is the most popular community radio service in the municipality. It is one of the earliest station to broadcast outside the Kathmandu Valley. It promotes local culture and airs local news. Lumbini Quiz is very popular among the students. While folk music and local news is popular among the adult population.

References

External links

Populated places in Rupandehi District
Municipalities in Lumbini Province
Nepal municipalities established in 2014